Majeshti (also Romanized as Majeshtī, Machasht, Māchashtī   , Mah Jashtī, Mahjeshti, Majashti, and Majestī) is a village in Kakavand-e Gharbi Rural District, Kakavand District, Delfan County, Lorestan Province, Iran. At the 2006 census, its population was 43, in 8 families.

References 

Towns and villages in Delfan County